The Golden Goblet Outstanding Artistic Achievement (Chinese: 金爵奖最佳艺术贡献奖) is a special jury prize awarded to films in the main category of competition at the Shanghai International Film Festival.

Award Winners

References

Lists of films by award
Shanghai International Film Festival